Nikh Kamin (born 25 December 1967 at Talo, Arunachal Pradesh) is an Indian politician from Arunachal Pradesh. He belongs to the People's Party of Arunachal and is president of the party. Earlier, he used to be a member of Nationalist Congress Party.

In 2004, he was elected from Lower Subansiri district's Yachuli assembly constituency of Arunachal Pradesh.

In 2014, Kamin was elected unopposed from Bordumsa-Diyun seat in the 2014 Arunachal Pradesh Legislative Assembly election.

References

Living people
1967 births
Nationalist Congress Party politicians from Arunachal Pradesh
People from Lower Subansiri district
People's Party of Arunachal politicians
Arunachal Pradesh MLAs 2014–2019
Arunachal Pradesh MLAs 2004–2009
National People's Party (India) politicians